A good luck charm is an amulet or other item that is believed to bring good luck.

Almost any object can be used as a charm. Coins and buttons are examples, as are small objects given as gifts, due to the favorable associations they make. Many souvenir shops have a range of tiny items that may be used as good luck charms. Good luck charms are often worn on the body, but not necessarily.

History
The Mojo is a charm originating in African culture. It is used in voodoo ceremonies to carry several lucky objects or spells and intended to cause a specific effect. The concept is that particular objects placed in the bag and charged will create a supernatural effect for the bearer. Even today, mojo bags are still used.

Europe also contributed to the concept of lucky charms. Adherents of St. Patrick (the patron saint of Ireland), adopted the four-leaf clover as a symbol of Irish luck because clovers are abundant in the hills of Ireland.

List
Luck is symbolized by a wide array of objects, numbers, symbols, plant and animal life which vary significantly in different cultures globally. The significance of each symbol is rooted in either folklore, mythology, esotericism, religion, tradition, necessity or a combination thereof.

See also
Horseshoe
List of bad luck signs
Luck
Saint Cajetan, Patron saint of gamblers

Notes

Sources 

Lucky